Bering Sea Wilderness is a wilderness area in the U.S. state of Alaska. It encompasses St. Matthew Island, Hall Island, and Pinnacle Island and is part of the larger Bering Sea unit of the Alaska Maritime National Wildlife Refuge.

External links
Wilderness.net - Bering Sea Wilderness
Recreation.gov - Bering Sea Wilderness

Wilderness areas of Alaska
Protected areas of Bethel Census Area, Alaska
Alaska Maritime National Wildlife Refuge
Protected areas established in 1970
1970 establishments in Alaska